Una notte, un sogno (One night, a dream) is a 1988 Italian comedy film directed by Massimo Manuelli and starring Sergio Rubini.

Plot
Turin, Italy late 1980s. A young woman, bored and disturbed by the behavior of her husband and friends, decide to leave the villa in which he lives to go in the town. On the road she is attacked by a group of young thugs, but a photographer saves her. This man, just before this meeting, he witnessed a crime committed by the Chinese mafia, so he is forced into hiding. Between the two fugitives born solidarity, which soon turned into a feeling. But the short love story, which has as its backdrop the nocturnal environments of Turin, will fade away at dawn to the Porta Nuova train station, on a train leaving for Narvik. The photographer must escape: it is a witness too dangerous. She tries to reunite with him.

Cast
 Sergio Rubini as Bruno
 Claire Nebout as Silvia
 Hugues Quester
 Laura D'Arista
 Rodolfo Traversa
 Pietro Molino
 Quinto Cavallera 
 Franco Vaccaro
 John Chen

Release
The film was premiered in Italy in Turin on May 4, 1988

See also  
 List of Italian films of 1988

References

External links

1988 films
1988 comedy films
Italian comedy films
1980s Italian-language films
Films set in Turin
1980s Italian films